The Nicaraguan passport is issued to citizens of Nicaragua for international travel. As of 1 January 2017, Nicaraguan citizens had visa-free or visa on arrival access to 112 countries and territories, ranking the Nicaraguan passport 46th in terms of travel freedom (tied with Marshallese passport) according to the Henley visa restrictions index.

The current Nicaraguan passport has 89 security features, including bidimensional barcodes, holograms, and watermarks, and is reportedly one of the least forgeable documents in the world.

Appearance
Like all Central American passports, the cover is navy blue with gold letters indicating the official name of the country in Spanish; at the top it has the words Centroamérica and in the middle a map of Central America showing the territory of Nicaragua shaded. At the bottom it has a text indicating the type of passport.

The passport consists of 48 pages. It is 124 mm in width and 86 mm in height.

Identification page
 Photo of the passport holder 
 Type ("P" for passport)
 Code of the country
 Passport serial number
 Surname and first name of the passport holder
 Citizenship
 Date of birth (DD. MM. YYYY)
 Gender (M for men or F for women )
 Place of birth
 Date of issue (DD. MM. YYYY)
 Passport holder's signature
 Expiry date (DD. MM. YYYY)
 Issuing authority

Validity
Passports for people over 16 years of age are valid for ten years and for people under 16 years of age for five years.

See also

 Visa requirements for Nicaraguan citizens
 Central America-4 passport

References

 Council regulation 539/2001 
 Council regulation 1932/2006 
 Council regulation 539/2001 consolidated version, 19.1.2007 
 List of nationals who do need a visa to visit the UK .
 List of countries whose passport holders do not require visas to enter Ireland .

Nicaragua
Government of Nicaragua